Sabily (My Way) is a discontinued Linux distribution based on Ubuntu, designed by and for Muslims. 
Originally named Ubuntu Muslim Edition (presented as UbuntuME), development for Sabily was active from 2007 to 2011.

Sabily is designed for Muslim users to have out-of-the-box Arabic language support and Islamic software and tools installed, including a prayer times tool, a Qur'an study tool, a Hijri calendar, etc.

The Unity shell is based on GNOME 3 on Sabily 11.10, Unity 2D for graphic cards without 3D capabilities. The Unity shell became available on the Sabily 11.04 Badr DVD. Ubuntu Classic Desktop was the default desktop in Sabily (11.04), but Unity in Ubuntu 11.04. New applications in Badr: Islamic Date, Zakat Calc, Gufw, DesktopNova, AutoKey, recordMyDesktop, Anki.
The full version of Sabily comes with out-of-the-box educational software, codecs for the most used media formats. Wisabi is a Sabily 11.04 installer for Windows XP, Windows Vista or Windows 7 based on Wubi.

History 
Sabily was previously named as Ubuntu Muslim Edition (UbuntuME). Sabily is following releasing cycle of Ubuntu. After Ubuntu 9.04, It was changed to Sabily.

 UbuntuME 7.04 released 12 October 2007
 UbuntuME 7.10 released 2 December 2007
 UbuntuME 8.04 released 17 May 2008
 UbuntuME 8.04.1 released 22 July 2008
 Sabily 9.04 Taibah released 12 May 2009
 Sabily 9.10 Gaza released 27 December 2009
 Sabily 10.04 Manarat released 28 June 2010
 Sabily 11.04 Badr released 5 May 2011
 Sabily 11.10 Uhud released 19 December 2011

Versions available
There are currently three versions of Sabily, but there is no official host at the moment.

 Small version (967.96 MB), contains the main Sabily packages, including artwork and Islamic applications and Arabic support.
 Full version (1.55 GB), contains the same as the Small version plus multimedia, educational and miscellaneous packages.
 Ultimate version (3.3 GB), has the same content as the Full version, plus Qur'an offline recitations provided by Muhammad Siddeeq al-Minshawi, Huzify, Saad al-Ghamadi and Mishary Rashed Alafasy.

The Ultimate version is useful mainly when not connected to the Internet, yet all Sabily versions provide online Qur'an recitations.

Sabily is available as a Live DVD, which can be booted on the host computer without installation. The Wisabi installer can install Sabily to the hard disk within Microsoft Windows, without involving risky formatting or partitioning.

Additional software 
As compared to Ubuntu:
zekr: Qur'anic Study Tool
minbar: Islamic prayer times application
: application that pops up prayers at predetermined times
: Firefox extension that displays Islamic daily prayer times
: UI frontend to DansGuardian (web content filtering tool)
nanny: the GNOME Nanny parental-control system
: Electronic Encyclopedia System
: Islamic calendar
 Othman: Othman Qur'an Browser
: Qur'an viewer
: abbreviated chapters in the Messenger vita
: Men around the prophet

Arabic support 
language-pack-ar: translations for language Arabic
language-pack-gnome-ar: GNOME translations for language Arabic
mozilla-Firefox-locale-ar: Mozilla Firefox Arabic language/region package
aspell-ar: Arabic dictionary for aspell
acon: Text console arabization
bicon: Console that supports bidirectional text display
Arab eyes : Arabic-English dictionary
fonts-hosny-amiri: Arabic Naskh style typographically oriented font (Amiri is a classical Arabic typeface in Naskh style for typesetting books and other running text)

Sabily software 

Zekr is an open platform Quran study tool for browsing and researching on the Quran. Recitations and translations are available for download.

Small version DVD available online recitations:

 Abdulbasit Abdussamad (64kbit/s)
 Mishary bin Rashid Al-Afasy (128kbit/s)
 Saad Al-Ghamdi (40kbit/s)
 Mohammed Siddiq Al-Minshawi (16kbit/s)
 Maher Al-Muaiqly (128kbit/s)
 Abu Bakr Ash-Shatri (128kbit/s)
 Saud Al-Shuraim (128kbit/s)
 Abdul Rahman Al-Sudais (192kbit/s)

Minbar indicates the time when Muslims should pray. It runs in background as a tray icon and plays the athan (call to prayer) at prayer times. Minbar works with the main calculation methods, such as Muslim League (default), Shafii, and Hanafi. Muslims observe salat five times a day, and Minbar helps to remind the user of daily prayer times.

Monajat is an application for Linux and Windows that displays Azkar messages. It runs in the background as a tray icon and displays hadiths. The application is an application provided by the Sabily community.

Zakat Calc is an application for Linux. Zakat, or almsgiving, is one of the Five Pillars of Islam, is the giving of 2.5% of one's possessions (surplus wealth) to charity, generally to the poor and needy. Zakat Calc helps Muslims to calculate zakat types: gold, silver, stones, jewels, savings in bank, property, loans, business, firms, animals (2.5%) and agriculture (10%). It was created using the Gambas programming language and it runs on Linux.

Gnome Nanny (parental control) is an easy way to control how long users or children can be on the computer and what they can and cannot access browsing the web.

See also 
 Free software

References

External links 
 
 sabily blogsphere: Sabily 11.04 Badr Released
 Quick Look: Ubuntu Muslim Edition 10.10 (Sabily Al Quds)
 Sabily 10.04 review from Desktop Linux Reviews
 Sabily 9.04 review from Softpedia
 Sabily 9.04 review from ExtremeTech
 Sabily 9.04 reviewed in LinuxToday * Zakat Calc in Launchpad

Ubuntu derivatives
Islamic software
Operating system distributions bootable from read-only media
Arabic-language computing
Linux distributions